György Tóth (24 April 1915 – 27 September 1994) was a former Hungarian footballer who played for Salgótarjáni SE, Szeged FC, Gamma FC, Újpest FC and MTK as a goalkeeper.

He coached the Mali national football team.

Personal life
He's father of former goalkeeper Zoltán Tóth and grandfather of the United States men's national beach soccer team goalkeeper Chris Toth.

References

1915 births
1994 deaths
Hungarian footballers
Hungary international footballers
Association football goalkeepers
Újpest FC players
MTK Budapest FC players
Hungarian football managers
Hungarian expatriate football managers
Mali national football team managers
Expatriate football managers in Mali
Hungarian expatriate sportspeople in Mali
Sportspeople from Szeged